Natalie van den Adel (born 25 October 1990) is a Dutch professional basketball player who plays for Porta XI Ensino of the Liga Femenina de Baloncesto. Standing at 1.88 m (6 ft 2 in), she plays shooting guard or small forward.

She competed in the 2013 European Championship qualifiers with statistics, averaging 6.9 points and 2.8 rebounds in eight games.

External links
Profile at eurobasket.com
Profile at csurams.com

References 

1990 births
Living people
Sportspeople from Dordrecht
Dutch women's basketball players
Dutch expatriate basketball people in Spain
Shooting guards
Small forwards
20th-century Dutch women
20th-century Dutch people
21st-century Dutch women